Rojai Trawick, better known as Mista Grimm, is a rapper formerly signed to Epic Records' sub-label, 550 Music. Grimm's first release was the 1993 single "Indo Smoke" featuring Warren G and Nate Dogg from the Poetic Justice soundtrack. The following year Grimm released a single entitled "Situation: Grimm" that appeared on the Higher Learning soundtrack. Mista Grimm completed his debut album Things are Looking Grimm that was originally set to be released during the summer of 1995; however, after the album's lead single "Steady Dippen" failed to make an impact, the album was shelved. Little has been heard of Mista Grimm subsequently aside from a song called "Grow Room" on DJ Pooh's 1997 album Bad Newz Travels Fast, appearances on T-Bone's albums Tha Hoodlum's Testimony (1995) and GospelAlphaMegaFunkyBoogieDiscoMusic (2002), and an appearance on Warren G's 2001 album The Return of the Regulator.

Discography

Unreleased albums
Things Are Looking Grimm (1995)

Singles

References

External links
[] Album and singles info, chart info and music video links.

Living people
Year of birth missing (living people)
21st-century American rappers
550 Music artists
G-funk artists
Gangsta rappers
People from West Covina, California
Rappers from Los Angeles